The Try Guys is an American online comedy series currently available for streaming on YouTube starring comedians and filmmakers Keith Habersberger, Ned Fulmer, Zach Kornfeld, and Eugene Lee Yang; Fulmer was removed from the company in September 2022. The group created the Try Guys while working for BuzzFeed and subsequently separated themselves from the internet media company in 2018.

Series overview 
The series is divided up into two distinct parts. The first part took place since their inception in 2014 until they left Buzzfeed in 2018. The second phase began in mid-2018 when the four guys began an independent company, 2nd Try LLC.

List of episodes

Notes

 :  The ""Try Guys Ultimate Japanese Street Food Taste Test (ft. The Food Babies)", "Women Wear Wedding Dresses For The First Time", and "Food Babies 60 oz Tomahawk Steak Challenge" videos were marked as private videos as a result of Ned's removal from The Try Guys.
 :  "The Try Team Gets Celebrity Hair Makeovers" was temporary marked as private videos as a result of Ned's removal from The Try Guys but has been made public again

List of YouTube Shorts

Series
Over the series of The Try Guys episodes, particular episodes have branched off as part of series of a specific topic or mini-series.

 Recurring shows 
 Try Guys Game Time – All Try Guys

This segment includes the Try Guys sitting in a living room playing games and quizzes, such as 'who knows the other Try Guys best' and 'try not to laugh'. The feature has the Try Guys shouting "Try Guys Game Time!" throughout the video and each Try Guy wearing their signature onesie (Keith: giraffe, Zach: turtle, Eugene: tiger, Ned: rooster).
 The Barkchshler – Keith
This is a The Bachelor style segment which sees Keith judging dogs. Contestants compete by producing videos according to Keith's directions. Originally, it was just Keith dogsitting the Try Guys' pups for a whole day.
 The Rank King – Eugene
The segment features Eugene ranking things, such as fruit and cheap beer, from best to worst. The other Try Guys appear as guests to pick their favorites. It features Eugene's catchphrase: I'm right, you're wrong, shut up.
 Candid Competition – Zach
The segment sees Zach buying products, such as clothes or cakes, from several stores/manufacturers, without these companies knowing they are involved in a competition. Zach tests the products and picks a winner.
 Eat The Menu – Keith

This segment was born out of Keith's love for fast food, especially fried chicken. It involves him eating everything on the menu from popular restaurants like KFC, Taco Bell, Panda Express, McDonald's, Olive Garden and Burger King. Keith then decides which of the food items are best and the least best according to his standards.
 Ned & Ariel – Ned
This segment documents the life of Ned's family: his wife Ariel, his son Wes, and his dog Bean. This documented the struggles of becoming a new father during a newly bought house renovation.
 Try DIY – Ned
This segment is Ned & Ariel transforming their friend's forgotten spaces into beautiful interiors.
 Food Babies – Alexandria & YB
This segment is a spin-off of Keith's "Eat the Menu". What originally started as a Patreon series of Alexandria and YB trying to finish what remained of the "Eat the Menu" episodes, the women are challenged by the Try Guys to try to consume 400 chicken nuggets and 100 tacos. They also feature together in food-related episodes with the Try Guys.

"Without A Recipe"
The Try Guys compete against each other to try and create foods without a recipe.

Competition Results

Season 1

Season 2

Season 3

Season 4

Season 5

"Eat The Menu"
Keith eats everything on different fast-food menus.

Season 1

Season 2

Season 3

Season 4

"The Barkchshler"
Keith makes his fans' dogs compete for his amusement

Season 1

Season 2

"Candid Competition"
Zach makes big chains go head to head without their knowledge.

"Ned & Ariel"
The adventures of the Fulmer family: Ned, Ariel, Wes, and Finn.

"The Try Guys: Game Time"
It's Try Guys Game Time! A series of fun videos where you get to hang out with us, play games, and tell stories. #TGGT

"Rank King"
Eugene is the rank king. He ranks things. He's right, you're wrong, shut up.

"The TryPod"

The Try Guys have swum with sharks, survived in the wild, shocked themselves with birthing simulators, and risked their lives for their videos. In this weekly podcast they dissect their experiences as internet creators and best friends who have made a living failing upwards.

"Food Babies"

"Try DIY"
Ned & Ariel transform their friend's forgotten spaces into beautiful interiors!

"You Can Sit With Us" 
The Try Guys launched a second podcast called You Can Sit With Us on their channel TryPods. It features Becky, Keith's wife; Ariel, Ned's Wife; Maggie, Zach's girlfriend and Rachel the Try Guy's producer. Occasionally the show features Matt, Eugene's boyfriend. The show is also produced by Miles Bonsignore, however while he speaks in the TryPod, Miles rarely speaks on You Can Sit With Us.

References

Try Guys